The Atlantic Cup is a pre/mid season football tournament held in Algarve, Portugal for European football clubs from national leagues which do not operate in the winter months. It therefore consists mainly of teams from Scandinavia, Northern and Central Europe.

It was founded in 2011 by former Arsenal, Benfica and Sweden midfielder, Stefan Schwarz and ex-Millwall goalkeeper Brian Horne.

Television coverage was originally provided by Eurosport and Eurosport 2.

Winners

Editions

2011 edition 

This was the first edition of The Atlantic Cup, contested by two Danish and two Swedish teams. IF Elfsborg won the competition.

2012 edition 
This was the second edition, contested by six teams from five countries. FC Midtjylland won the competition beating Dinamo Zagreb 1–0 in the final.

Final

2013 edition 

This was the third edition, contested by three teams. S.C. Farense and SV Mattersburg also played but theirs matches were not taken account to the final standings. Rapid Wien won the competition.

2014 edition 
This was the fourth edition of, contested by 8 teams from 6 countries.
Television coverage was provided by Eurosport and Eurosport 2.
The Danish team F.C. Copenhagen won the tournament, finishing the competition only with victories and without conceding a goal.
The Swedish team Örebro SK finished in second place, also with victories only, but with a lower goal-difference than F.C. Copenhagen.

Participating teams
 F.C. Copenhagen
 FC Midtjylland
 FC Slovan Liberec
 FC Spartak Moscow
 Örebro SK
 FH
 Breiðablik
 SV Mattersburg

Standings

Matches

2015 edition

Group A

Group B

Finals

Tournament Final

2016 edition 
The 2016 edition had the same format as the 2015 Atlantic Cup. The winner of Group A (FK Jablonec) did not contest the final due to the schedule of its flight back home. They were replaced in the final by Group A runner-up, Örebro SK.
FC Zenit Saint Petersburg won the competition after a penalty-shootout.

Group A

Group B

Finals

2017 edition

The 2017 edition was disputed in the same format as 2016 Atlantic Cup was.

Group A

Group B

Finals

2018 edition
The 2018 edition was disputed in the same format as 2017 Atlantic Cup.

Group A

Group B

Finals
Due to Rijeka's domestic schedule commitments, they departed Portugal early and were replaced by Stade Nyonnais, an invited team. As per tournament rules and regulations, they played in the 7th/8th place play-off match.

2019 edition
Nine teams from 7 countries participated in the 2019 edition.

2020 edition
The 2020 edition returned to the two-group format, last seen in 2018.

Group A

Group B

Finals

2022 edition
The 2022 tournament was originally intended to follow the two-group format. However, AIK Stockholm was forced to withdraw due to COVID, forcing a format change and welcoming F.C. Copenhagen into the tournament.

2023 edition
The 2023 tournament was held 2–10 February 2023 with 10 teams competing.

Performance

By team

By country

References

External links
The Atlantic Cup

Portuguese football friendly trophies
Recurring sporting events established in 2011
Sport in Algarve